The Dīn-i-Ilāhī, known during its time as Tawḥīd-i-Ilāhī ("Divine Monotheism") or Divine Faith, was a new syncretic religion or spiritual leadership program propounded by the Mughal emperor Akbar in 1582.
According to Iqtidar Alam Khan, it was based on the Timurid concept of Yasa-i Changezi (Code of Genghis Khan), to consider all sects as one. The elements were drawn from different religions.

Name
The name Dīn-i Ilāhī literally translates to "God's Religion", "Religion of God", or "divine religion". According to the renowned historian Mubarak Ali, Dīn-i Ilāhī is a name that was not used in Akbar's period. At the time, it was called Tawhid-i-Ilāhī ("Divine Monotheism"), as it is written by Abu'l-Fazl, a court historian during the reign of Akbar. This name suggests a particularly monotheistic focus for Akbar's faith. The anonymous Dabestan-e Mazaheb uses the name Ilahíah to refer to the faith.

History

Akbar promoted tolerance of other faiths and even encouraged debate on philosophical and religious issues. This led to the creation of the Ibādat Khāna ("House of Worship") at Fatehpur Sikri in 1575, which invited theologians, poets, scholars, and philosophers from all religious denominations, including Christians, Hindus, Jains, and Zoroastrians.

Since Akbar had severe dyslexia, rendering him totally unable to read or write, such dialogues in the House of Worship became his primary means of exploring questions of faith. Despite his aforementioned illiteracy, Akbar would eventually amass a library full of more than 24,000 volumes of texts in Hindi, Persian, Greek, Latin, Arabic and Kashmiri. The later Mughal Emperor and son of Akbar, Jahangir, stated that his father was "always associated with the learned of every creed and religion." In a letter to King Philip II of Spain, Akbar laments that so many people do not inquire into issues within their own religion, stating that most people will instead "follow the religion in which [they] were born and educated, thus excluding [themselves] from the possibility of ascertaining the truth, which is the noblest aim of the human intellect."

By the time Akbar established the Dīn-i Ilāhī, he had already repealed the jizya (tax on non-Muslims) over a decade earlier in 1568. A religious experience while he was hunting in 1578 further increased his interest in the religious traditions of his empire. From the discussions held at the Ibādat Khāna, Akbar concluded that no single religion could claim the monopoly of truth. This revelation inspired him to leave Islam and create a new religion Dīn-i Ilāhī in 1582 and Akbar along with his loyal officials converted to this new religion Dīn-i Ilāhī in 1582.

This conversion of Akbar to Dīn-i Ilāhī  angered various Muslims, among them the Qadi of Bengal Subah and Shaykh Ahmad Sirhindi, responded by declaring it to be blasphemy to Islam.

Some modern scholars have argued that the Din-i Ilahi was a spiritual discipleship of Akbar of his own belief which he propounded in his new religion.

After Akbar

Dīn-i Ilāhī appears to have survived Akbar according to the Dabestān-e Mazāheb of Mohsin Fani. However, the movement was suppressed by penalty and force after his death and was totally eradicated by Aurangzeb, a task made easier by the fact that the religion never had more than 19 adherents.

In the 17th century, an attempt to re-establish the Dīn-i-Ilāhī was made by Shah Jahan's eldest son, Dara Shikoh, but any prospects of an official revival were halted by his brother, Aurangzeb, who executed him on grounds of apostasy. Aurangzeb later compiled the Fatawa-e-Alamgiri, reimposed the jizya, and established Islamic Sharia law across the Indian Subcontinent, spreading Islamic orthodoxy and extinguishing any chance of religious reform for generations.

Beliefs and practices
Although the spirit and central principles of Dīn-i Ilāhī were adapted from Sufism (including ideas from the Andalusi Sufi mystic, Ibn al-'Arabi), Akbar endeavored to create a synthesis of other beliefs and so his personal religion borrowed concepts and tenets from many other faiths. Aligned with Sufi practices, one's soul is encouraged to purify itself through yearning of God. Virtues included generosity, forgiveness, abstinence, prudence, wisdom, kindness, and piety. The following details illustrate the personal religious observances of Akbar:

The visitation of Jesuit missionaries such as Rodolfo Acquaviva brought the virtue of celibacy into the House of Worship, where it consequently became a virtue of Akbar's faith that was not mandatory (as it is for the priests of Roman Catholicism) but respected. The faith also adopted the principle of ahimsa, an ancient virtue of almost all Indian religions, including Hinduism, Buddhism and Jainism. The nonviolence extended from humans to animals, encouraging vegetarianism and prohibiting the slaughter of animals for any reason at all. The Dīn-i Ilāhī had no sacred scriptures and, similar to both Islam and Sikhi, there was no priestly hierarchy.

Light was a focus of divine worship, with a light-fire ritual based on the yasna (the primary form of worship in Zoroastrianism) and an adoption of the hymn of the 1,000 Sanskrit names for the sun. Followers were referred to as chelah (meaning "disciples").

The major practices and beliefs of Dīn-i-Ilāhī were as follows:
The unity of God
Followers salute one-another with Allah-u-Akbar or Jalla Jalalahu (meaning: "may His glory be glorified")
Absence of meat of all kinds
One's "on-birth-by-anniversary" party was a must for every member
Ahimsa (non-violence); followers were prohibited from dining with fishers, butchers, hunters, etc.

Ṣulḥ-i-kul
It has been argued that the theory of Dīn-i Ilāhī being a new religion was a misconception which arose because of erroneous translations of Abu'l-Fazl's work by later British historians. However, it is also accepted that the policy of sulh-i-kul, which formed the essence of Dīn-i Ilāhī, was adopted by Akbar as a part of general imperial administrative policy. Sulh-i-Kul means "universal peace". According to Abu'l-Fazl, the emperor was a universal agent of god, and so his sovereignty was not bound to any single faith. In this, Akbar appointed officials based on their ability and merit, regardless of their religion or background. This helped to create a more efficient government and contributed to the prosperity and cultural achievements of the Mughal period. The emperor is further prohibited from discriminating between the different religions of the realm and if the ruler did discriminate, then they were not fit for the role as an agent of god. Abu'l-Fazl saw the religious views of Akbar as a rational decision toward maintaining harmony between the various faiths of the empire.

Disciples
The initiated disciples of Dīn-i Ilāhī during emperor Akbar's time included:

 Shaikh Mubarak
 Shaikh Faizi
 Jafar Beig
 Qasim Khan
 Abu'l-Fazl ibn Mubarak
 Azam Khan
 Abdus Samad
 Mulla Shah Muhammad Shahadad
 Sufi Ahmad
 Mir Sharif Amal
 Sultan Khwaja
 Mirza Jani Thatta
 Taki Shustar
 Shaikhzada Gosala Benarasi
 Sadar Jahan
 Sadar Jahan's first son
 Sadar Jahan's second son
 Birbal
 Prince Murad

See also
 Allopanishad
 Sirr-i-Akbar
 Majma-ul-Bahrain
 Dabestan-e Mazaheb
 Dara Shikoh
 Ganga-Jamuni tehzeeb
 Religious policy of the Mughals after Akbar

References

Akbar
Medieval India
Mughal Empire
Religious pluralism
Religious syncretism in Asia
Universalism
Indian culture
Religion in India
History of religion in India